General elections were held in Gibraltar on 24 March 1988. The elections were a watershed in Gibraltar politics, as they saw the first win by the Gibraltar Socialist Labour Party (GSLP), led by Joe Bossano, whose candidates took 58% of the popular vote and eight of the fifteen seats available in the Gibraltar House of Assembly. Bossano's party took control away from the Association for the Advancement of Civil Rights (AACR), under outgoing Chief Minister Adolfo Canepa. The AACR had been the dominant political party in Gibraltar politics for over forty years and had won every election but one since 1945. After this, it was never to win another general election, while Bossano was to remain in office continuously for eight years, from 25 March 1988 to 17 May 1996.

Results

By candidate
The first fifteen candidates were elected to the House of Assembly.

References

General elections in Gibraltar
Gibraltar
General
Gibraltar
Election and referendum articles with incomplete results